Brett Davis is an American comedian and actor. He hosted a public access show called The Special Without Brett Davis in the New York City metro area. He has also hosted The Podcast for Laundry and The Macaulay Culkin Show. In 2015, he won the Andy Kaufman Award. In 2019, he joined the cast of the National Lampoon Radio Hour.

Career 
Davis grew up in New Jersey, and as a teenager, he was a caller and contributor to The Best Show with Tom Scharpling, and guest-hosted NYCTV's New York Noise. He also performed regularly around the New Brunswick punk scene, which was the topic of an early short film, BANANAZZZ.

Davis hosted the public access show The Special Without Brett Davis, taking over the time slot previously held by The Chris Gethard Show, on the Manhattan Neighborhood Network. The show aired over 170 episodes, and featured performers including Jo Firestone, Cole Escola, Joe Pera, Julio Torres and Bridey Elliott, and guests such as Gilbert Gottfried, Michael Shannon, Lita, Rose McGowan, The Thermals, and Screaming Females.

Davis hosted The Podcast For Laundry, "a satire of podcasting" about a host being driven crazy by doing a podcast about laundry. He also performs character-based comedy around New York City, and won the Andy Kaufman Award in 2015 for his interactive live performances.

Along with Sally Burtnick, he has hosted The Macaulay Culkin Show, a monthly comedy show held at the Shea Stadium DIY Venue in East Williamsburg from 2013 to 2017. The show has an annual summer comedy festival. The show had previously been unaffiliated with the actor until Culkin made an appearance in 2019.

In 2019, he became a cast member of the rebooted National Lampoon Radio Hour.

Filmography

Television

Film

References

External links
 

Year of birth missing (living people)
Living people
Comedians from New Jersey